Merrill Township may refer to the following places in the United States:

 Merrill Township, Michigan
 Merrill Township, Hettinger County, North Dakota

See also
 Morrill Township (disambiguation)

Township name disambiguation pages